Bifrenaria longicornis is a species of orchid.

longicornis